Frank Moro (January 11, 1944 – June 21, 1993) was a Cuban–American film and television actor.

Selected filmography
 The Kidnapping of Lola (1986)
 Lola the Truck Driver 3 (1991)

References

Bibliography
 Ryan Rashotte. Narco Cinema: Sex, Drugs, and Banda Music in Mexico's B-Filmography. Palgrave Macmillan, 2015.

External links

1944 births
1993 deaths
American male film actors
American male television actors
20th-century American male actors